The Ministry of General Education is a ministry in Zambia. It is headed by the Minister of General Education and oversees primary and secondary education. Tertiary and vocational education is overseen by the Ministry of Higher Education, which was split from the main ministry in 2015.

List of ministers

Deputy ministers

References
https://www.lusakatimes.com/2020/07/29/president-lungu-has-fired-general-education-minister-david-mabumba-with-immediate-effect/ 

General Education
 
Zambia